George Weston Anderson (September 1, 1861 – February 14, 1938) was a United States circuit judge of the United States Court of Appeals for the First Circuit.

Education and career

Born on September 1, 1861, on a farm in Acworth, New Hampshire, Anderson received an Artium Baccalaureus degree, cum laude, in 1886 from Williams College and a Bachelor of Laws, magna cum laude, in 1890 from Boston University School of Law. He entered private practice in Boston, Massachusetts from 1890 to 1914. He was an instructor at Boston University School of Law from 1891 to 1894. He was the United States Attorney for the District of Massachusetts from 1914 to 1917. He was a member of the Interstate Commerce Commission from 1917 to 1918.

Role in Brandeis confirmation

In 1916, he worked to win Senate approval of Louis Brandeis when he was nominated to the United States Supreme Court, serving as counsel to the subcommittee that considered the nomination and conducting some of the crucial cross examination of witnesses.

Constitutional convention delegate

In 1916, the Massachusetts General Court and electorate approved a calling of a Constitutional Convention. Anderson was elected as a Delegate at Large to serve as a member of the Massachusetts Constitutional Convention of 1917.

Federal judicial service

Anderson was nominated by President Woodrow Wilson on October 1, 1918, to a seat on the United States Court of Appeals for the First Circuit vacated by Judge Frederic Dodge. He was confirmed by the United States Senate on October 24, 1918, and received his commission the same day. He assumed senior status on September 30, 1931. His service terminated on February 14, 1938, due to his death.

Notable case

Anderson was noted for dissenting when the court upheld some of the convictions arising from the Red Scare of 1919 to 1920. In June 1920, he effectively prevented any further resumption of the Palmer raids of November 1919 and January 1920 when his decision in the case of Colyer v. Skeffington ordered the discharge of 17 arrested radicals. His opinion concluded that there was no evidence that the Communist Party of the United States had urged a violent overthrow of the United States Government and he strongly criticized the United States Department of Justice for using entrapment and for its failure to follow proper legal procedures. Of the deportation proceedings he wrote: "A more lawless proceeding it is hard for anyone to conceive.... I can hardly sit on the bench as an American citizen  and restrain my indignation. I view with horror such proceedings as this." The Colyer case remained controversial. For example, during Senate hearings held to consider charges that Attorney General A. Mitchell Palmer had ignored due process in arresting radicals in late 1919 and early 1920, a former Department of Justice official testified that Anderson had shown favoritism to witnesses on behalf of the defendant aliens in the Colyer deportation case.

Family

Anderson was married for eight years to Winnie E. Mitchell of Mason, New Hampshire, until her death. They had two sons and a daughter. In 1897 he married Addie Earle Kenerson of Boston, who survived him. The same year, he was elected a Fellow of the American Academy of Arts and Sciences. He lived in the Wellesley Hills neighborhood of Wellesley, Massachusetts.

Retirement and death

Anderson took inactive senior status in 1932, meaning that while he remained a federal judge, he no longer heard cases or participated in the business of the court. He died at his winter home in DeLand, Florida, on February 14, 1938.

Further reading
 Alan Rogers "Judge George W. Anderson and Civil Rights in the 1920s," The Historian, vol. 54 (2007), 289-304
 Google Books: "The 'Colyer Case'" in Brown, R.G., et al., To the American People: Report Upon the Illegal Practices of the United States Department of Justice, 42-56 (Washington, DC: National Popular Government League, 1920). Co-authors include Felix Frankfurter and Roscoe Pound.
 Institutional racism

References

Sources
 

1861 births
1938 deaths
Judges of the United States Court of Appeals for the First Circuit
Boston University School of Law alumni
Boston School Committee members
Williams College alumni
United States Attorneys for the District of Massachusetts
United States court of appeals judges appointed by Woodrow Wilson
20th-century American judges
Fellows of the American Academy of Arts and Sciences
People from Acworth, New Hampshire
Members of the 1917 Massachusetts Constitutional Convention